Allegheny Social Hall located at 810-812 Concord Street in the East Allegheny neighborhood of Pittsburgh, Pennsylvania, was built in 1903.  It was built at a time when this area was part of the city of Allegheny, Pennsylvania.  The building was added to the List of Pittsburgh History and Landmarks Foundation Historic Landmarks in 2003.

References

Buildings and structures in Pittsburgh
Buildings and structures completed in 1903
Pittsburgh History & Landmarks Foundation Historic Landmarks